Maxwell F.C. were a nineteenth-century Glasgow-based senior football club. They were based in Queen's Park, Glasgow.

History

From the 1878 season, the club played in navy and white hooped jerseys and navy shorts.

The club is notable for being the first club of the first black football player; Andrew Watson.

The club competed in the 1880–81 Scottish Cup. They were beaten by Oxford - a Glasgow team from Crosshill - in the first round.

Notable former players

 Andrew Watson (footballer, born 1856), Scottish international football player; and the first black association football player.

References

 
Defunct football clubs in Scotland
Football clubs in Glasgow
Association football clubs established in 1874
Association football clubs disestablished in 1897
1874 establishments in Scotland
1897 disestablishments in Scotland
Govanhill and Crosshill